Hvalsmoen was the site of a former military camp to the north of Hønefoss in Ringerike in Viken county, Norway.  

In 1893, the Norwegian Parliament resolved to establish a military training camp to train  engineer troops for the national Army.
The camp was the base for the Army engineering regiment (Hærens ingeniørregiment).  There were formerly a total of three military camps around Hønefoss: Hvalsmoen, Helgelandsmoen and Eggemoen. All were closed on June 13, 2001. In 2005, the camp was sold to local investment firm Røysi Invest for 52 million kroner.

References

Norwegian Army bases
Military installations in Viken